Holy See-Papua New Guinea relations of diplomatic character were established in 1973 when an Apostolic Delegation of Papua New Guinea (from the Apostolic Delegation of Australia and Papua New Guinea) were created.  In 1976, this delegation was created as the Apostolic Delegation of Papua New Guinea and The Solomon Islands.  In 1977, the Vatican established the Apostolic Nunciature of Papua New Guinea and Apostolic Delegation of Solomon Islands).  The Holy See established its Apostolic Nunciature in Port Moresby the capital and largest city in Papua New Guinea.
 
In May 1984, Pope John Paul II made a visit of pilgrimage to Papua New Guinea and the Solomon Islands.

The current Nuncio to Papua New Guinea and the Solomon Islands is Archbishop Kurian Mathew Vayalunkal who was appointed in 2016 to replace Archbishop Michael Banach.

See also 
 Foreign relations of the Holy See

External links 

Diplomatic Relations of the Holy See

References